Witter Bynner Fellowships are administered by the Library of Congress and sponsored by the Witter Bynner Foundation for Poetry, an organization that provides grant support for poetry programs through nonprofit organizations. Fellows are chosen by the U.S. Poet Laureate, and are expected to participate in a poetry reading at the Library of Congress in October and to organize a poetry reading in their respective cities.

List of Fellows
2017 — Ray Gonzalez
2016 — Allison Adelle Hedge Coke
2015 — Emily Fragos and Bobby C. Rogers
2014 — Honorée Fanonne Jeffers, and Jake Adam York (posthumous)
2013 — Sharon Dolin and Shara McCallum 
2012 — L. S. Asekoff and Sheila Black 
2011 — Forrest Gander and Robert Bringhurst 
2010 — Jill McDonough and Atsuro Riley
2009 — Christina Davis and Mary Szybist 
2008 — Matthew Thorburn and Monica Youn
2007 — Laurie Lamon and David Tucker
2006 — Joseph Stroud and Connie Wanek 
2005 — Claudia Emerson and Martin Walls 
2004 — Dana Levin and Spencer Reece 
2003 — Major Jackson and Rebecca Wee 
2002 — George Bilgere and Katia Kapovich 
2001 — Tory Dent and Nick Flynn 
2000 — Naomi Shihab Nye and Joshua Weiner 
1999 — David Gewanter, Heather McHugh, and Campbell McGrath
1998 — Carl Phillips and Carol Muske-Dukes

See also
Witter Bynner Poetry Prize
American poetry
List of poetry awards
List of literary awards
List of years in poetry
List of years in literature

References

External links
The Witter Bynner Foundation for Poetry website
Library of Congress web page on Witter Bynner Fellowships

American poetry awards